St. Michael's School, Kannur, officially St. Michaels Anglo Indian Higher Secondary School, Kannur, is a private Catholic primary and secondary school located in Kannur, in the state of Kerala, India. Founded by the Christian Brothers in 1865 and administered by the Society of Jesus since 1887, the school admits all castes and creeds but gives preference to Catholics. It includes nursery through higher secondary and prepares students for the state syllabus exams.

History
St. Michael's School is one of the oldest schools in the city.

Oral tradition tells of St. Michael's School roots in a Malayalam-medium school attached to Holy Trinity Church, Kannur in the late 1850s. The Christian Brothers came in 1862, introduced English, and erected a new building in 1865, from which its present history is now traced. When these Brothers departed in 1887 the Jesuit priests who ran the parish took over the school. In 1907 the Jesuits made it a European-style middle school, and in 1936 a high school under the Anglo-Indian code. In 1974, for need of financial assistance, the school came under the Kerala Education Rules, as an Anglo-Indian Higher Secondary School.

St. Michael's School has been ranked among the best schools in India.

Facilities
Facilities include smart classrooms, a multipurpose auditorium and a basketball court, along with laboratories for chemistry, physics, zoology, and botany plus an audio-visual room. There are special rooms for music and for arts.

See also

 List of Jesuit schools
 List of schools in Kerala
 Violence against Christians in India

References

External links 
 

Jesuit secondary schools in India
Jesuit primary schools in India
Christian schools in Kerala
Schools in Kannur
Educational institutions established in 1865
1865 establishments in India